Trichopsocus dalii is a species of Psocoptera from Trichopsocidae family that can be found in United Kingdom and Ireland. The species are green coloured.

Habitat
The species feeds on beech, elder, elm, fir, hawthorn, hemlock, holm oak, ivy, oak, poplar, and sea buckthorn, yew.

References

Trichopsocidae
Insects described in 1867
Psocoptera of Europe